Il Foglio (English: "The Paper") is an Italian centrist daily newspaper with circulation around 25.000 copies per day (with an overall spread of 47.000). It was founded in 1996 by the Italian journalist and politician Giuliano Ferrara after he left as editor of the magazine Panorama. Since 2015, it has been directed by Claudio Cerasa.

History and profile
Il Foglio was founded in 1996 by the Italian journalist and politician Giuliano Ferrara after he left as editor of the magazine Panorama. The paper is headquartered in Rome.

The main editorial policy of Il Foglio (meaning in Italian  "The Sheet", i.e. formed from a single sheet of paper as used in 19th-century newspapers) is a summary of the most important news of the day with comment and analysis on them. Recently, the size of the paper has increased, with insert and extra pages incorporated especially on Saturday.

Politics 
Anglo-American conservatism can roughly be considered its closest political position. It features editorials inspired by American newspapers, especially The Wall Street Journal.

Il Foglio can also be considered pro-free market in economics.

Despite its conservative leaning, a significant part of its journalists are members or were members of the Radical Party. This newspaper also hosts several articles from left-leaning and independent columnists.

Ownership
Since 2016, the paper has been owned by Sorgente Group, a group operating in the field of real estate investments and finance and chaired by Valter Mainetti. In April 2016 it announced that it had bought 97,48% of the ownership. In December 2016, Sorgente group bought 100% of the ownership and is thus the only owner of the newspaper.

Ten years earlier, on 23 April 2006, Giuliano Ferrara had declared to the Report Italian news television show (within the episode "Il finanziamento quotidiano" di Bernardo Iovene), that the newspaper ownership was shared by the following:
 PBF S.r.l. 38%.
 Sergio Zuncheddu (Sardinian builder and owner of the largest daily newspaper of Sardinia, l'Unione Sarda, and of some regional television broadcasting companies, Videolina and Tele Costa Smeralda),  20% to 25%.
 Denis Verdini (Former national coordinator of the PDL), 15%.
 Giuliano Ferrara, 10%.
 Michele Colasanto,  10%.

References

External links
 Official website

1996 establishments in Italy
Conservatism in Italy
Daily newspapers published in Italy
Newspapers published in Milan
Newspapers established in 1996
Italian-language newspapers